Associazione Sportiva Dilettantistica Cordenons, or simply Cordenons, is an Italian association football club located in Cordenons, Friuli-Venezia Giulia. It currently plays in Seconda Categoria Friuli-Venezia Giulia.

In 2020 it merged with S.S. 3S Cordenons to form A.C. Cordenonese 3S.

History
The club was founded in 1957 as AC Cordenonese and, with this name, it often plays in the highest regional division of Friuli (Prima Categoria from 1959 to 1969, Promozione from 1969 to 1991). In the 1970s, the youth sector was founded and excelled at the regional level, also winning second place in the 1980–81 Juniores (under 18 years old) Italian championship.
In the summer of 1994 it merged with fellow citizens of SS Tre S and became USC Cordenons. After years characterized by an almost continuous participation in Promozione league (since 1991 it is the second regional series), in the 2005–06 season it goes down to Seconda Categoria. Under the leadership of president Nadio Polotto, the long-awaited climb arrives. In 2007–08, as ASD Cordenons, it won the Seconda Categoria league, in 2008–09 it won the Prima Categoria play-off and was promoted to Promozione. The following seasons saw the garnet team in the top positions of Promozione, until the 2013–14 season, in which they won the play-offs, thus gaining access to Eccellenza.

In 2016 it won Eccellenza league one match-day early and was promoted to Serie D for the first time. But the adventure in Serie D lasts only one season: the 1–0 defeat in the play-out against Tamai condemns the garnet to relegation. In June 2019, in full financial crisis, the club did not register for the 2019-20 Eccellenza season and the team was dissolved. Immediately after, AC Cordenonese was created, which was not enrolled in any league, but which dedicated itself only to the youth sector.

In Cordenons there is also another club: S.S. Tre S, known as 3S Cordenons. The 3 "S" of the name mean "Società Sportiva Sclavons" (Sclavons is a district of Cordenons). The team was founded in 1962, its colors were the green and orange, and has always played in the minor leagues.

In June 2020 the merger between these two teams is made (after the first merger in 1994, 3S was recreated): AC Cordenonese puts the youth sector while SS 3S Cordenons the first team that plays in Seconda Categoria. Thus was born AC Cordenonese 3S, the playing field is the Stadio Assi (home of Cordenonese), while the training one is the Campo di via Ponte del Vado (home of 3S).

Recent seasons

Key

Honours
Eccellenza Friuli-Venezia Giulia (1st regional level)
Winners: 2015–16

Colors and badge 
AC Cordenonese 3S colors are garnet, orange and green.

References

External links
Cordenonese 3S page @ friuligol.it
Cordenonese 3s page @ tuttocampo.it
Cordenonese 3S page @ facebook.com

Cordenons
Cordenons
Cordenons